Wallace Edwin Halder (September 15, 1925 – October 27, 1994) was a Canadian ice hockey player. He was a member of the Ottawa RCAF Flyers who won the gold medal in ice hockey for Canada at the 1948 Winter Olympics in St. Moritz. He was the top scorer of the Canadian team, as well as the top scorer of the entire tournament.

References

External links
profile at databaseOlympics.com

1925 births
1994 deaths
Ice hockey players at the 1948 Winter Olympics
Medalists at the 1948 Winter Olympics
Olympic gold medalists for Canada
Olympic ice hockey players of Canada
Olympic medalists in ice hockey
Ice hockey people from Toronto